Dorithia peroneana is a species of moth of the family Tortricidae first described by William Barnes and August Busck in 1920. It is found in the US state of Arizona.

The wingspan is 17 mm.

References

Moths described in 1920
Euliini